North Louisiana Refuge Complex is a National Wildlife Refuge complex in the state of Louisiana.

Refuges within the complex
 Black Bayou Lake National Wildlife Refuge
 D'Arbonne National Wildlife Refuge
 Handy Brake National Wildlife Refuge
 Louisiana Wetland Management District
 Red River National Wildlife Refuge
 Upper Ouachita National Wildlife Refuge

References
Complex website

National Wildlife Refuges in Louisiana